Koshi Province is one of the seven provinces of Nepal established by the country's new constitution of 20 September 2015, comprising fourteen districts, namely, Bhojpur, Dhankuta, Ilam, Jhapa, Khotang, Morang, Okhaldhunga, Panchthar, Sankhuwasabha, Solukhumbu, Sunsari, Taplejung, Terhathum and Udayapur. There are many categorized monument sites in Koshi Province. Here is district wise List of Monuments which is in the Koshi Province.

Lists per district of Koshi Province 
 List of monuments in Bhojpur District
 List of monuments in Dhankuta District
 List of monuments in Ilam District
 List of monuments in Jhapa District
 List of monuments in Khotang District
 List of monuments in Morang District
 List of monuments in Okhaldhunga District
 List of monuments in Panchthar District
 List of monuments in Sankhuwasabha District
 List of monuments in Solukhumbu District
 List of monuments in Sunsari District
 List of monuments in Taplejung District
 List of monuments in Terhathum District
 List of monuments in Udayapur District

References 

Province no. 1
 
Tourist attractions in Koshi Province